Tendeba was a town of ancient Caria in the territory of Stratonicea. It commanded a strong position and was a point of contest between the Rhodians and Macedonians in their war
 
Its site is tentatively located near Akgedik, Asiatic Turkey.

References

Populated places in ancient Caria
Former populated places in Turkey